The weightlifting competition at the 1960 Summer Olympics in Rome consisted of seven weight classes, all for men only.

Medal summary

Medal table

References

Sources
 

 
1960 Summer Olympics events
1960
1960 in weightlifting